Why Be Good? is a 1929 American silent comedy film produced by First National Pictures starring Colleen Moore and Neil Hamilton. The film has no audible dialogue but is accompanied by a Vitaphone soundtrack with music, sound effects and some synchronized singing.

Plot
Winthrop Peabody Jr. and his friends prepare to frolic into the night before he must begin work the following day at his father's department store. Before departing, Winthrop Peabody Sr. lectures his son about women and warns him to avoid the store's female employees.

Pert Kelly, after winning a dance contest, is wooed by gentlemen of questionable character. Pert catches the eye of Peabody Jr., who drives her home and schedules a date for the following night. Because she was out late, Pert is tardy to work and must report to the personnel office, where she is surprised to find Peabody Jr. working. Peabody Sr. sees what has happened and fires Pert.

Peabody Jr. explains to Pert that it was not he who had terminated her, and they schedule another date. Lavish gifts arrive for Pert to wear to the next date. Her father admonishes her about the lack of virtues of the modern man, and Peabody Sr. repeats his warning to his son.

On the next date, Peabody Jr. has devised a test of Pert's virtue. When he tries to push her past her personal limits, she protests and passes his test. They are married that night and prove her virtue to Peabody Sr., who cannot now refute it.

Cast
 Colleen Moore as Pert Kelly
 Neil Hamilton as Winthrop Peabody Jr.
 Bodil Rosing as Ma Kelly
 John St. Polis as Pa Kelly
 Edward Martindel as Winthrop Peabody Sr.
 Louis Natheaux as Jimmy Alexander
 Eddie Clayton as Tim
 Lincoln Stedman as Jerry
 Collette Merton as Julie
 Dixie Carter as Susie

Preservation status
Why Be Good? had been considered a lost film for many decades, with only the film's Vitaphone soundtrack still in existence. In the late 1990s, a 35mm print of the film was discovered in an Italian archive. Restoration work began in 2012 and was completed in 2014, funded by Warner Bros. and The Vitaphone Project.

The U.S. premiere of the restoration was hosted by the Academy of Motion Picture Arts and Sciences at the Los Angeles County Museum of Art's Bing Theater on September 6, 2014. This same restoration was released on DVD-R by the Warner Archive Collection on October 28, 2014 and screened at New York's Film Forum on November 9, 2014. It has also aired on the Turner Classic Movies channel.

References
Notes

Bibliography
Codori, Jeff (2012), Colleen Moore; A Biography of the Silent Film Star, McFarland Publishing,(Print , EBook ).

External links
 
 
 
 
 Why Be Good? at SilentEra
 AFI Catalog of Feature Films
 Why Be Good soundtrack at the Internet Archive

1929 films
1929 romantic comedy films
American romantic comedy films
American silent feature films
American black-and-white films
Films directed by William A. Seiter
Films set in New York City
First National Pictures films
Transitional sound films
1920s rediscovered films
Rediscovered American films
1920s American films
Silent romantic comedy films
Silent American comedy films